Bahar Soomekh (born March 30, 1975) is an Iranian-American actress.  She is best known for her roles in Crash and the Saw franchise.

Early life 
Bahar was born in Tehran, Iran, to a devout Persian-Jewish family.  She moved with her parents and sister, Saba Soomekh, to Los Angeles, California, United States in 1979 during the Islamic Revolution of Iran.  Soomekh attended Sinai Akiba Academy and Beverly Hills High School.

Bahar later attended the University of California, Santa Barbara.  She graduated in 1997 with a B.A. in environmental studies.

Career 
Following her graduation from UCSB, Soomekh worked in motivational sales while taking acting classes.  In the beginning of her acting career, Soomekh guest starred on several television programs, including JAG and 24.  She ultimately quit her day job to pursue acting full-time and landed her role in Crash less than three months later.

Soomekh's breakthrough role came as Dorri in the Academy Award-winning movie for Best Picture, Crash.  Following her success in Crash, People magazine listed Soomekh as a member of the Class of 2006 as "New on the Scene".  She followed up with roles in  Syriana and Mission: Impossible III.  In 2006, she had a leading role as Dr. Lynn Denlon in the horror film Saw III.  Soomekh had a recurring role as Margo in the television series Day Break and guest appearances on shows such as Ghost Whisperer and CSI: Crime Scene Investigation. Her last film role was in Just like a Woman.

After the Southern California area experienced the loss of film industry jobs to other locations, Soomekh decided to pursue a real estate career to remain close to her family.

Personal life 
Bahar married Clayton Frech in 2001. The couple have three children.  One of their children, Ezra Frech, was born with a disability. He was a double silver Parapan American Games medalist in 2019 and was named as a finalist for the 2014 Sports Illustrated SportsKid of the Year.

Filmography

References

External links 
 
 

1975 births
Living people
University of California, Santa Barbara alumni
American film actresses
American television actresses
Iranian emigrants to the United States
21st-century Iranian actresses
American people of Iranian-Jewish descent
Jewish American actresses
Actresses from Tehran
Actresses from Los Angeles
Iranian Jews
Iranian film actresses
21st-century American Jews
21st-century American women
American Sephardic Jews
American Mizrahi Jews